The Qianjiangyuan National Forest Park is a national park in Kaihua County, Zhejiang, China. It is bordered by Mount Huang on the north, Qiandao Lake on the east, and Mount Sanqing on the west.

History
In December 1992 it has been categorized as a provincial park by the Zhejiang provincial government. In August 1999 it has been designated as a national park by the State Forestry Administration.

Geography
There are over 10 streams and ponds in the park.

It was founded in 1981.

Climate
Qianjiangyuan National Forest Park is in the subtropical monsoon climate zone and exhibits four distinct seasons. It is known as "China's Amazon Rainforest".

It is a very well known and beautiful lake in China.

Fauna and flora
The forest coverage is 97.55%. As of 2014, there are 720 species of woody plants belonging to 287 genera and 98 families in the park.

Within the boundaries of the park, the following number of species are known to live: 58 species of mammals, 104 species of birds, 77 species of reptiles and amphibians. Among them the first rank of national protection has Elliot's pheasant, hairy-fronted muntjac and clouded leopard; the second rank has hoplobatrachus tigerinus, Mandarin duck, Chinese sparrowhawk, macaque, pangolin, otter, large Indian civet, and small Indian civet.

See also
 List of protected areas of China

References

National parks of China
Protected areas established in 1992
Geography of Zhejiang
1992 establishments in China
Tourist attractions in Quzhou